Paula Sevilla (born 28 June 1997) is a Spanish athlete. She was the Spanish 100m national champion in 2019 and 2020. In 2022, she became the Spanish national champion in 200m.

Career
Sevilla was part of the Spanish team that won gold at the 2017 European Athletics U23 Championships in Bydgoszcz, Poland in the 2017 European Athletics U23 Championships – Women's 4 × 100 metres relay. In 2022, Sevilla’s new personal best time of 22.86 placed her as the second fastest Spanish women over 200m of all time, behind only Sandra Myers. When subsequently winning the Spanish national athletics championships shortly afterwards Sevilla actually ran a lower time than her new personal best, winning in a time of 22.73, but it was classified as a wind assisted race.

Sevilla was part of the Spanish 4 x 100m team that finished  fifth at the World Athletics Championships in Eugene, Oregon, twice breaking the Spanish national record. The team had initially broken the national record running 42.61 in the qualifying heats to qualify for the final. In the final the following day they lowered the national record again, to 42.58 seconds.

She was then announced as part of the Spanish relay team for the 2022 European Athletics Championships in Munich. In Munich, Sevilla also competed individually in the 200m and finished tenth fastest in the semi-finals.

References

External links

1997 births
Living people
Spanish female sprinters
20th-century Spanish women
21st-century Spanish women